The Duke of Hamilton was one of the oldest pubs in London, situated in Hampstead.

In 2011, the pub was awarded "Londoner of the Day" by London 24 magazine. The Not For Tourists Guide to London 2014 cited it as being "as good a pub you're likely to find anywhere".

The pub closed in July 2017, and was reopened in early 2018 as the "Hampstead Lounge & Jazz Club".

See also
 List of pubs in London

References

External links
Official site

Pubs in the London Borough of Camden
Buildings and structures in Hampstead